The Claflin School is a historic former school building at 110–112 Washington Park, Newtonville, Massachusetts. It is a -story brick building, with a tall hip roof, projecting side-gabled wings, and a tall central gable section. The main facade is symmetrically arranged, with brick quoining around windows and corners, and entrances set in round-arch openings. It was built in 1891, and is a well-preserved example of Richardsonian Romanesque design. Its architect was Merrill J. Brown.

The building was listed in the National Register of Historic Places on September 16, 1984, and included in the Newtonville Historic District in 1986.

See also
 National Register of Historic Places listings in Newton, Massachusetts

References

National Register of Historic Places in Newton, Massachusetts
School buildings on the National Register of Historic Places in Massachusetts
Schools in Newton, Massachusetts
Individually listed contributing properties to historic districts on the National Register in Massachusetts